Moshe "Musa" Peled (July 31, 1925 - April 16, 2000) was an Israeli military commander, tat aluf (Brigadier General) of the Israeli Defense Forces. His last position in the IDF was Commander of the Israeli Armored Corps. After that he served as CEO of Rafael Advanced Defense Systems (1987-1992) and head of  Yad La-Shiryon, the Armored Corps Memorial Site and Museum at Latrun (1986-2000). He was Commander of the IDF Command and Staff College (1969-1972).

He was born in  Ein Ganim (now within Petah Tikva) to  Zalman Eisenberg and Shoshana, daughter of Baruch Golomb and joined the Haganah at the age of 14.

References

Further reading
, כנגד כל הסיכויים - אלוף מוסה פלד ("Against All Odds - General Musa Peled: : Jezreel Valley man, fighter, farmer, leader of the counterattack in the Golan Heights in the Yom Kippur War and restorer of the Armored Corps") - a biography, 2019. Chapter 1 is freely available online

1925 births
2000 deaths
Israeli generals